Cheek Mountain Thief is the first album by Cheek Mountain Thief, released on August 13, 2012.

Track listing
 "Cheek Mountain"
 "Showdown"
 "Spirit Flight"
 "Strain"
 "There's A Line"
 "Attack"
 "Nothing"
 "Snook Pattern"
 "Wake Him"
 "Darkness"

References 

2012 debut albums
Cheek Mountain Thief albums
Full Time Hobby albums